Olle Henrik Martin Anderberg (13 September 1919 – 26 September 2003) was a Swedish wrestler. He competed in the 1948, 1952 and 1956 Summer Olympics in freestyle and Greco-Roman events and won a silver medal in the Greco-Roman featherweight in 1948 and a gold in the freestyle lightweight in 1952. Between 1942 and 1962 Anderberg won three world, two European and 27 national titles.

Anderberg's father Frans and brother Gunnar played football in the Swedish premier division. Olle tried football too, but had a much better career in wrestling, both as a competitor and a coach. He worked with the national teams of Finland, Turkey and Iran (1957–1960), and was personally known to Mohammad Reza Pahlavi.

References

External links

profile

1919 births
2003 deaths
People from Landskrona Municipality
Olympic wrestlers of Sweden
Wrestlers at the 1948 Summer Olympics
Wrestlers at the 1952 Summer Olympics
Wrestlers at the 1956 Summer Olympics
Swedish male sport wrestlers
Olympic gold medalists for Sweden
Olympic silver medalists for Sweden
Olympic medalists in wrestling
World Wrestling Championships medalists
Medalists at the 1952 Summer Olympics
Medalists at the 1948 Summer Olympics
European Wrestling Champions
Sportspeople from Skåne County
20th-century Swedish people